Daniel Janssens (born 2 December 1925) is a Belgian former middle-distance runner. He competed in the men's 1500 metres at the 1952 Summer Olympics.

References

External links
 

1925 births
Possibly living people
Athletes (track and field) at the 1952 Summer Olympics
Belgian male middle-distance runners
Olympic athletes of Belgium